Events from the year 1912 in Croatia.

Incumbents
 King - Franz Joseph I
 Ban - Nikola Tomašić

Events
 1 January - Croatian is introduced as the official language in Dalmatia.

Arts and literature
 Tajna Krvavog mosta, the first novel in the Grička vještica series by Marija Jurić Zagorka, is serialized in Male novine.

Sport
5 May - Maksimir stadium opened.
12 May - The Croatian Chess Federation is established.
12 June - The football section of the Croatian Sports Association is formed.
20 August - HŠK Slaven formed.

Births
5 February - Josip Palada, tennis player (died 1994).
15 November - Ivana Lang, composer and pianist (died 1982).

Deaths
21 May - Natko Nodilo, politician and historian (born 1834).

References

 
Years of the 20th century in Croatia
Croatia, 1912 In